Mariano Melgar District is one of the twenty-nine districts of the Arequipa Province in Peru.

External links
  www.munimarianomelgar.gob.pe Official district web site

References

Districts of the Arequipa Province
Districts of the Arequipa Region